Zhang Yufeng (born 5 January 1998) is a Chinese professional footballer who currently playsfor Chinese Super League club Changchun Yatai.

Club career
Zhang Yufeng started his professional football career in July 2016 when he was promoted to China League One club Beijing Renhe's first team squad. On 25 September 2016, he made his senior debut in a 3–3 home draw against Meizhou Hakka, coming on as a substitute for Guillermo Molins in the 55th minute. On 3 May 2017, Zhang was sent off by dangerous tackle to Ralf in a 2017 Chinese FA Cup match against Beijing Guoan. He received a ban of two matches for his unsporting behavior on 6 May 2017. Zhang played only one league match of 2017 season on 21 October after Beijing Renhe won promotion to the first tier in advance, in a 2–0 away loss against Nei Mongol Zhongyou. On 10 March 2018, he made his Chinese Super League debut in a 2–1 away win over Tianjin Quanjian, coming on for Ivo in the 87th minute.

On 13 April 2021, Zhang joined Chinese Super League club Changchun Yatai. He made his debut for Yatai on 22 April 2022, in a 2-1 win against Dalian Professional.

Career statistics 
.

References

External links
 

1998 births
Living people
Chinese footballers
Footballers from Hubei
People from Enshi
Association football midfielders
Beijing Renhe F.C. players
Chinese Super League players
China League One players